Mission San Pedro de Mocama was a Spanish colonial Franciscan mission on Cumberland Island, on the coast of the present-day U.S. state of Georgia, from the late 16th century through the mid-17th century. It was built to serve the Tacatacuru, a Mocama Timucua people.

History
San Pedro de Mocama was part of the missions system of Spanish Florida, a territory of New Spain.  It was built c.1580 to serve the Tacatacuru peoples, a chiefdom of the Timucua. San Pedro was one of the earliest and most prominent missions of Spanish Florida, and its church was as big as the colonial one in St. Augustine.

Together with Mission San Juan del Puerto on Fort George Island (in the mouth of the St. Johns River, Florida), it was one of the principal missions of what the Spanish came to know as the Mocama Province. San Pedro de Mocama, protected by an associated fort, was for a time at the northern extent of Spanish power, serving as a bulwark against the Guale people to the north.

Mission San Pedro y San Pablo de de Puturibato was also built from 1595–1597 on Cumberland Island.

Tacatacuru peoples
The Tacatacuru were part of a Timucua group known as the Mocama. The Mocama spoke a dialect of Timucuan also known as Mocama and lived in the coastal areas of southern Georgia and northern Florida. Mission San Pedro was built at the south end of Cumberland Island, near the main village of the Tacatacuru.

By 1595 some of the Tacatacuru−Mocama living near the mission were fluent in Spanish.  Some had learned to read and write in a combination of Spanish, Latin, and the system of writing the Timucua language devised by Father Francisco Pareja, who worked at the San Juan del Puetro mission, located at the mouth of the St. Johns River at present-day Fort George Island. He wrote a catechism in Spanish and Timucuan that was printed in 1612.

The Tacatacuru were severely affected by disease and warfare through the 17th century. Mission San Pedro de Mocama was abandoned in 1660. Pressure from other tribes led the Tacatacuru to abandon Cumberland Island by 1675.

See also
 Spanish missions in Georgia
 Spanish Florida topics — colonial region.
 Timucua peoples topics
 Viceroyalty of New Spain — Spanish colonial North America.

Notes

References
 

Spanish missions in Georgia (U.S. state)
Native American history of Georgia (U.S. state)
Spanish Florida
Timucua
1587 establishments in New Spain
Cumberland Island